David Henderson-Tate (1937 – 1996) was a British actor of television and film and a voice actor who performed as David Tate. He is probably best known for his work in the original radio series of The Hitchhiker's Guide to the Galaxy (1978) and the television series The Hitchhiker's Guide to the Galaxy (1981).

Early life and education
Born in 1937, Tate attended the Royal Academy of Dramatic Art (RADA), graduating with the Academy's acting diploma program in 1958.

Career 
He made his television début as Marcel in the 'Toddler on the Run' episode of The Wednesday Play (1966), and played Basil Biggleswade in 'The Portsmouth Defence' episode of the same series later in the same year. He voiced Scrooge's nephew Fred and Charity Man in the Oscar-winning animated television special A Christmas Carol (1971) before playing Sgt. Tapling in 'The Secret of the Foxhunter' episode of the series The Rivals of Sherlock Holmes (1971). In 1975, he appeared in The Basil Brush Show and was Mr. Hawke in the television series Romance (1977). In 1978 he was the Commentator in the film International Velvet and voiced various roles in the original radio series of The Hitchhiker's Guide to the Galaxy (1978), including Eddie the Computer, Benjy Mouse, the Allitnils, and the Happy Vertical People Transporter, with Douglas Adams later saying of him that "He was one of the backbones of the series. We had him there every week." In 1981 Tate voiced Eddie and Benjy Mouse in the television series The Hitchhiker's Guide to the Galaxy, while 1982 saw him
as Radio Voice in the series Solo. He was the TV Commentator in Never Say Die (1987). He provided various voices for the animated television series Dragonslayer Quark, Quark and the Long Winter and Quark and the Vikings (1987). Tate provided various additional voices for An American Tail: Fievel Goes West (1991) and The Ticker Talks (1995).

He narrated audio cassettes of children's stories which accompanied the magazine series Once Upon a Time, narrated on Story Teller and was on the satirical radio current affairs sketch show Week Ending (1977).

Death 
Tate died in 1996 at the age of 58 or 59.

Filmography

Film

Television

References

External links

1937 births
1996 deaths
Alumni of RADA
English male radio actors
English male film actors
English male television actors
English male voice actors
20th-century English male actors